Rachid O. (born 1970) is a Moroccan writer.

He was born in Rabat; after studying in Morocco, he went to live in France. He writes mainly about the equilibrium between the Muslim world and homosexuality.  His work Chocolat chaud, is autofiction about a Moroccan man exploring his sexual identity in France.

Bibliography
 1995 : L'enfant ébloui, Gallimard
 1996 : Plusieurs vies, Gallimard
 1998 : Chocolat chaud, Gallimard
 2003 : Ce qui reste, Gallimard
 2013 : Analphabètes, Gallimard

See also
 LGBT rights in Morocco
 Abdellah Taïa

References 

French gay writers
French Muslims
Gay Muslims
Moroccan LGBT people
French male writers
Moroccan writers
1970 births
Living people
Writers from Rabat